Uplift may refer to:

Science
 Geologic uplift, a geological process
 Tectonic uplift, a geological process
 Stellar uplift, the theoretical prospect of moving a stellar mass
 Uplift mountains
 Llano Uplift
 Nemaha Uplift

Business
 Uplift factor, or simply "uplift", adjustments to employee benefits
 Uplift modelling, in marketing campaigns, the difference in response rate between a treated group and a randomized control group
 Uplift enterprise computer access to heightened security protocols.

Entertainment
 Uplift (science fiction), upgrading the capacities of a species or a civilization
 Uplift Universe, the setting for a series of novels by David Brin
 Uplifting trance, a musical genre similar to progressive trance
 "Uplift", a song by Pantera from their 2000 album Reinventing the Steel

Other uses
 Uplift Community High School, Chicago, Illinois, US
 Racial uplift, concept in African American cultural history